Lipstick Lounge, also known as The Lip, is a bar in East Nashville co-owned by Christa Suppan and Jonda Valentine. While it is lesbian-owned, it calls itself a bar for humans and is welcoming to anyone. It opened in a 125-year-old building on Woodland Street in September 2002, which Suppan bought in 2003. It is one of fewer than twenty remaining lesbian bars in the United States.

See also
Lesbian Bar Project

References

External links

LGBT nightclubs in the United States
Organizations established in 2002
Culture of Nashville, Tennessee
LGBT culture in the United States